The Ford Model 15-P flying wing was the last aircraft developed by the Stout Metal Airplane Division of the Ford Motor Company. After several flights resulting in a crash, the program was halted. Ford eventually re-entered the aviation market producing Consolidated B-24 Liberators under license from Consolidated Aircraft.

Development
A press release in Jan 1936 said that Ford was designing behind closed doors a new "flivver" using its new V-8 engine.

Design
The Model 15-P was a two-passenger "flying wing" or tailless design. It featured a rear-mounted Ford V-8 driving a tractor propeller with a driveshaft The fuselage was steel tube with an aluminum covering and the wings were fabric-covered. The landing gear was fully faired with large landing lights mounted in the fairings.

Operational history
Several test flights were made by test pilot Harry Russell, but after an accident the aircraft was put in storage. The aircraft was licensed by the Federal Bureau of Air Commerce in 1936, the same year Ford closed its aircraft division.  The remains of the 15P were used to create a prototype autogyro, but all trace of the 15P disappeared when the autogyro was scrapped.

Specifications

See also

References

External links
http://www.aerofiles.com/_ford.html

Ford aircraft
1930s United States civil utility aircraft
 
Aircraft first flown in 1935
Single-engined tractor aircraft